David Worth Mead (born September 3, 1973) is a Nashville-based pop singer-songwriter. Over the years he has toured extensively, headlining as well as opening shows for John Mayer, Fountains of Wayne, Ron Sexsmith, Liz Phair, Joe Jackson, and Shelby Lynne.

Biography and album releases
Born to a traveling-salesman father and schoolteacher mother, David Mead's family moved often during his childhood, mostly around the southern United States, before settling in Nashville, Tennessee, in 1986. As a kid, he sang in the church choir and school productions like The Sound of Music. When he was 13, he got his first guitar and was soon writing his own songs; three years later, he was gigging out professionally. His travels eventually took him to Nashville, where he played in bands such as Verdant Green; Blue Million; and Joe, Marc's Brother. Drawing on a wide range of influences, from the Beatles and Broadway to the Police and Rufus Wainwright, Mead has honed a highly melodic and emotionally direct style of pop.

The Luxury of Time
Mead moved to New York City in 1997 and signed a major-label deal with RCA Records the following year. The initial sessions for his debut – three songs recorded with Gus Dudgeon (Elton John, XTC) – proved unsuccessful and were scrapped. Mead then regrouped with producers Peter Collins (the Cardigans, Rush) and Jason Lehning (Emerson Hart, Alison Krauss), and between October of '98 and February of '99 cut The Luxury of Time. "The title came from the fact that I had all of my life up to that point to write the songs," Mead said. Indeed, the album's 13 songs were culled from 32 demos. Released in the fall of '99, the album garnered strong critical response and featured performances from Rusty Anderson (Paul McCartney), Kenny Aronoff (John Mellencamp, Smashing Pumpkins), and Paul Deakin (The Mavericks).

Mine and Yours
Mead's second album, produced by Adam Schlesinger (Fountains of Wayne), was recorded at New York City's legendary Sear Sound studio (John Lennon, Steely Dan) and released in May 2001 on RCA. Featuring guest performances from Dominique Durand (Ivy), Sean Pelton (the Saturday Night Live band), Danny Weinkaupf (They Might Be Giants), and Jody Porter (Fountains of Wayne), its 14 songs were recorded from 34 demos. Two of the album's most notable tracks, "Standing Here in Front of Me" and "Girl on the Roof," were written one week before recording commenced, after RCA asked for more "single material." "Standing Here in Front of Me" was later featured on CBS's The Bold and the Beautiful, and "Girl on the Roof" appeared in the motion pictures National Lampoon's Van Wilder and The Sweetest Thing, both released in April 2002.

Indiana
After Mine and Yours, Mead delivered a follow-up for RCA, but it was made under a proverbial dark cloud after an A&R person for the label proclaimed at the recording's commencement dinner that, given sales of Mead's first two albums, it was a "miracle" that a third was being recorded at all. The album was completed but ended up being shelved after BMG, RCA's parent company, merged RCA and J Records to form the RCA Music Group in 2003 and laid off approximately 50 staffers, including ones who worked in promotions, sales, and A&R; Mead and other artists were subsequently dropped from RCA's roster. He moved back to Nashville in late 2002 and, in between road gigs, started an EP with Nashville producer David Henry (Matthew Ryan, Guster); it soon blossomed into the full-length Indiana, released in May 2004 by Nettwerk America. Featuring some of Mead's best-loved songs, including the title track, "Nashville," and "Beauty," it remains his most recognized and critically acclaimed album ("A knack for telling stories via catchy, concise pop ditties," declared No Depression) to date.

Wherever You Are
Mead's third album for RCA, recorded in 2002 in Woodstock, New York, and Bath, England, finally emerged as a six-song EP in June 2005 via Eleven Thirty Records. "I got the album back when I left [RCA] but felt, after releasing Indiana, that the full package was confusing and not indicative of where I was going musically anymore, so I tried to frame the songs as more a lost piece of time," Mead says. PopMatters raved that Wherever You Are contains "mature songs that express genuine warmth and emotional intelligence."

Tangerine
In 2005 Mead married artist Natalie Cox and began work on his fourth LP. Produced by Brad Jones (Jill Sobule, Butterfly Boucher, Josh Rouse), Tangerine was released in May 2006 courtesy of Mead's own Tallulah! Media (his contract with Nettwerk wasn't renewed after Indiana). Paste magazine described it as "the sound of a singer/songwriter finding his voice," and it was nominated in the category of best pop/rock album at the sixth annual Independent Music Awards in 2007 (Mead's website was nominated for best band-website design).

Almost and Always
In 2008, having spent the previous year living in Brooklyn, New York, Mead moved back to Nashville after he and his wife separated. Mead reteamed with Brad Jones and recorded the intimate collection Almost and Always in seven days, most of it live. The majority of the album was cowritten with Bill DeMain of Swan Dive; they originally conceived the project for an imaginary chanteuse. The track "Last Train Home" was an NPR Song of the Day and was featured in a 2009 episode of ABC's Private Practice. Mead and DeMain also cowrote a second, as-yet-unreleased album, "1908 Division," a conceptual suite about the denizens of an apartment building where Mead once resided. Almost and Always was first released in Japan in October 2008, then in the United States ten months later on Cheap Lullaby Records.

Dudes
Mead's sixth album was "funded entirely by fans, friends and lovers," according to the liner notes. He raised $20,925 from 253 donors on Kickstarter in late 2010 to cover the recording, manufacturing, and distribution of Dudes and documented the recording sessions, which took place over nine days in New York City, on his YouTube channel in January 2011. Produced by Ethan Eubanks and Mead (Adam Schlesinger is credited as executive producer), the 12-song collection deepens Mead's songwriting with strains of Randy Newman-esque wry humor ("Bocce Ball") and sharp storytelling ("The Smile of Rachael Ray," which was NPR's Song of the Day on December 14, 2011; Stephen Thompson called it "a new Christmas classic; a minor miracle worthy of the season that surrounds it"). Dudes was released in November 2011. Earlier that year Mead married yoga instructor and nutritionist Liz Workman.

Cobra Pumps
On January 25, 2019, Mead sent an email to every address on his website's mailing list. "When it came time to figure how to release COBRA PUMPS," he wrote, "I needed money and, out of habit, approached a few different music business people for help. After a few slightly bizarre meetings in which algorithmically-induced metrics and social media compliance were discussed with a ferocity once reserved for killer hooks and Led Zeppelin, I deduced that I simply don't fit into the industry anymore, if I ever did. It now requires very different skill sets than the ones I have spent my life attempting to master. And that is OK with me ..." Mead emailed links to the album's ten tracks, as well as demos and other content, over the next ten days. Cobra Pumps became available for purchase on iTunes on January 29, and on CD and vinyl at Mead's website several days later. To promote the album, Mead created a semiserious LinkedIn page that lists various jobs and phases of his career, including: Recording Artist, Nettwerk Records, November 2003–July 2005 ("I toured all over the world for long periods of time. I was lonely"); Piano Player, Emerson Hart, March 2007–June 2008 ("Aside from the dissolution of a marriage and physical deterioration from accelerated alcohol abuse, there were no drawbacks"); Rental Manager, Workman, Inc., March 2010–Present ("I acquired advanced carpentry and maintenance skills. If it breaks and it's not an HVAC unit, I can usually repair it"); and Father, Meads, October 2012–Present ("I impregnated my wife with gusto and now co-parent two small and precious boys: Isaac, 5 3/4, and Moses, 2").

Collaborations
Mead has been involved in two high-profile side projects. In 2009 he cofounded Elle Macho, a power trio with Aussie singer-songwriter and bassist Butterfly Boucher and drummer Lindsay Jamieson (Ben Folds, Brendan Benson). They've released two EPs, ¡Es Potencial! (2009) and VoVo (2016), and one full-length, Import (2013) (which includes all five tracks from ¡Es Potencial!), and their zany videos and high-energy live shows have made them a Nashville favorite.

Mead also formed Davey Ukulele & the Gag Time Gang, a quartet that released The Adventures of Davey Ukulele & the Gag Time Gang in 2010. Jim Ridley of Nashville Scene wrote, "Sounding like a cross between 'Whip It'-era Devo and the pop pastiches on Phineas & Ferb (a mighty high compliment in my household), this merry kids' band actually camouflages a genuine Nashville supergroup: the tag team of David Mead, Swan Dive's Bill DeMain, Brother Henry's David Henry and The Mavericks' Paul Deakin."

Several times a year, Mead travels to Key West, Florida, to perform in a cover band called Phanni Pac (with Jason White, Scotty Huff and Paul Deakin) at the Hog's Breath Saloon. He has also been a regular guest singer with Nashville's popular '80s cover band Guilty Pleasures.

Acclaim

"David Mead is one of my favorite singer-songwriters." —John Mayer

"I have 'Nashville' by David Mead stuck in my head." —a tweet by Taylor Swift

"Apart from being such a great songwriter, he's probably the best singer in America." —Adam Schlesinger (Fountains of Wayne)

"A major tunesmith." —Mojo

"One of the best solo crooners since Jeff Buckley." —Paste

"Rich melodies ... a keen sense of pop music history, from Paul McCartney to Squeeze to Crowded House." —Nylon

"A clear-voiced tunesmith ... he scores with sweet melodies ..." —Entertainment Weekly

"Mead makes blue-collar rock of the most delicate kind, his soaring but unshowy falsetto and luscious harmonies far above the ordinary." —Uncut

Discography
 The Luxury of Time (RCA, 1999)
 Mine and Yours (RCA, 2001)
 Indiana (Nettwerk, 2004)
 Wherever You Are [EP] (Eleven Thirty, 2005)
 Tangerine (Tallulah!, 2006)
 Almost and Always (Cheap Lullaby, 2009; originally released in Japan in 2008)
 Dudes (self-released, 2011)
 Cobra Pumps (self-released, 2019)

Songs used in films and on television
"World of a King," in Boys and Girls (Miramax) and In Search of John Gissing (Sunlight Productions)

"Everyone Knows It But You," in Restaurant (York Entertainment)

"Girl on the Roof," in The Sweetest Thing (Columbia Pictures), National Lampoon's Van Wilder (Lionsgate), and The Future Diary, a pilot not picked up by ABC

"Only in the Movies," in Ed (NBC)

"Standing Here in Front of Me," in The Bold and the Beautiful (CBS)

"Beauty," in The Days (ABC)

"Only Living Boy in New York," in Everwood (WB)

"Hallelujah, I Was Wrong," in Men In Trees (ABC)

"Last Train Home," in Private Practice (ABC) and The Protector (Lifetime)

References

External links
 Official Website
 David Mead collection at the Internet Archive's live-music archive
 older UK fan site

American singer-songwriters
American male singer-songwriters
1973 births
Living people
21st-century American singers
21st-century American male singers